This is the list of notable stars in the constellation Andromeda, sorted by decreasing brightness.

 Notes

See also
List of stars by constellation

References

List
Andromeda